The Workers Union of the Comoros (Union des Travailleurs des Comores, UTC) is a national trade union center in the Comoros.

References

Trade unions in the Comoros